Home by Dawn is the fourth album by American singer-songwriter J.D. Souther, released in 1984 on Warner Bros. Records.

Musician reviewer J. D. Considine wrote simply: "Don't wait up."

Track listing
All songs written by J.D. Souther, except where noted.
"Home by Dawn" – 2:49
"Go Ahead and Rain" – 3:31
"Say You Will" (Souther, Danny Kortchmar) – 2:51
"I'll Take Care of You" – 2:32
"All for You" – 3:31
"Night" (Souther, Waddy Wachtel) – 3:29
"Don't Know What I'm Gonna Do" – 2:09
"Bad News Travels Fast" – 5:52
"All I Want" – 5:59

Personnel
J.D. Souther – guitar, piano, drums, vocals, backing vocals
Steve Goldstein – keyboards on "Night"
Don Henley – vocals, backing vocals
David Hungate – bass
Vince Melamed – keyboards
Josh Leo – guitar
Russ Martin – backing vocals
Randy McCormick – keyboards
Linda Ronstadt – vocals on "Say You Will"
Timothy B. Schmit – vocals, backing vocals
Waddy Wachtel – guitar on "Night"
Billy Joe Walker Jr. – guitar

Production
David Malloy - producer
Richard Bosworth - engineer
Joe Bogan - recording
Niko Bolas, Russ Martin - additional vocal recording

References 

J. D. Souther albums
1984 albums
Warner Records albums
Albums produced by David Malloy